Sir Alfred Joseph Shepperd (19 June 1925 – 15 October 2007) was a British industrialist.

Early life and education 
Alfred Joseph Shepperd was born on 19 June 1925, in London. His father was Alfred Charles Shepperd (1898–1939), a printer. His mother was Mary Ann (née Williams; 1896–1975), a milliner.

Shepperd attended the Archbishop Tenison's School, served in the Fleet Air Arm of the Royal Navy, and received a degree in economics from the University College London.

Career 
From 1949 to 1963, Shepperd worked at the Rank Organisation.

From 1963 to 1965, Shepperd worked at Selincourt & Sons.

From 1965 to 1967, Shepperd worked at the Chamberlain Group.

From 1967 to 1972, Shepperd was the managing director of Keyser Ullmann Industries.

From 1972 to 1977, Shepperd was the finance director of the Wellcome Foundation.

From 1977 to 1990, Shepperd was the chairman of the Wellcome Foundation.

From 1986 to 1990, Shepperd was the chairman of the Burroughs Wellcome Company.

From 1986 to 1990, Shepperd was the chairman and chief executive of Wellcome plc.

After he retired, Shepperd was a trustee at the National Institute of Economic and Social Research for ten years.

Personal life 
In 1950, Shepperd married Gabrielle Bouloux.

In 1989, Shepperd was knighted by Elizabeth II.

References

Further reading 

 

1925 births
2007 deaths
British industrialists
Alumni of University College London
People educated at Archbishop Tenison's Church of England School, Lambeth
20th-century British businesspeople